"Goodness Gracious Me" is a comedy song recorded by Peter Sellers and Sophia Loren. Released by Parlophone, it was a top 5 UK single in 1960. It features Sellers acting the role of an Indian doctor, and Loren of his wealthy Italian patient – who fall in love.

Conception and composition 
The song was conceived and instigated by George Martin, who was the producer at that time of Peter Sellers's comedy recordings.  Martin commissioned Dave Lee and Herbert Kretzmer to write the song.  Martin himself produced the recording.  Martin envisaged the song as a recording to be incorporated in the soundtrack of the film The Millionairess which was being filmed at that time starring Sellers and Loren.  However, the film's producers did not share his enthusiasm for including the song in the film's soundtrack and did not utilize it.  The studio was however happy to see the song released as a stand-alone single to promote the film.  In becoming a chart hit it succeeded in publicizing the film.

Release history 
Though the song did not feature in The Millionairess itself, some of the lyrics in the song refer to the film; for example, "There's nothing the matter with it; put it away please" referring to the scene when Epifania shows Dr. Kabir her tongue, pretending to be ill.

The song proved so popular in the United Kingdom that a follow-up song, "Bangers and Mash", was released.  Sellers sang and spoke the part of a Cockney asking for plain and simple English cooking, Loren singing the part of his Italian wife wanting to serve him traditional Italian food.  Both are featured on collections of Sellers' comedy recordings.

Since early 2010, videos have been created and posted using the scene of Sellers and Loren from the film, with the audio recording of the song as the soundtrack.

In popular culture 
In 1979, heart transplant pioneer, Christiaan Barnard and Australian actress, Chantal Contouri, performed the song together as part of Channel 7 Perth's annual Telethon.

In the 1990s, the song provided the inspiration for the title and theme tune of the BBC radio and TV comedy programme of the same name, starring British-based Indian characters.

In February 2013, the song was covered by Rowan Atkinson and Pixie Lott for a one off telethon From the Heart.

References 

Stereotypes of South Asian people
Ethnic humour
1960 songs
Songs with lyrics by Herbert Kretzmer
Song recordings produced by George Martin
1960 singles
Comedy songs
Novelty songs